The 1999–2000 Hertha BSC season was the 107th season in club history. The club played their home matches at Olympic Stadium. The season began on 11 August 1999 and finished on 20 May 2000. The club finished 6th in the Bundesliga. The club were eliminated in the fourth round of the DFB-Pokal, the preliminary round of the DFB-Ligapokal and the Second Group Stage of the Champions League.

Bundesliga

Bundesliga results

Table

Summary table

Weekly table

Domestic cups

Domestic cups review

DFB-Pokal results

DFB-Ligapokal result

Champions League

Champions League results

Third qualifying round

First group stage

First group stage results

First group stage table

Results summary

Second group stage

Second group stage results

Second group stage table

Second group stage results summary

Overall

Squad information

Squad and statistics

Squad, appearances and goals

Sources: 

|}

Bookings

Notes
1.Hertha BSC goals first.
2.Tennis Borussia Berlin were the home club

References

Hertha BSC
Hertha BSC seasons